James Swanwick (born 1975) is an Australian-American investor, entrepreneur, speaker, health & wellness coach and former SportsCenter anchor on ESPN. He is the creator of quit drinking programs 30 Day No Alcohol Challenge and Project 90; creator of blue-light blocking glasses Swannies by Swanwick Sleep, co-founder of international media agency Crocmedia and host of podcast, The James Swanwick Show. He has authored three books.

Career 
Swanwick was born in Bacchus Marsh, Australia and grew up in Brisbane, Australia. 
He was educated at the Anglican Church Grammar School and studied at the University of Queensland.

Swanwick has worked as a print, TV and radio journalist. 
He began his career in 1993 as a reporter at The Courier-Mail in Brisbane, Australia. 
In 1996, Swanwick won the Queensland Media Award for his interview and exposé on Pauline Hanson, one of Australia’s most publicized and controversial political figures. 
Swanwick moved to London in 1999 where he reported for Sky Sports. 
In 2003, he moved to Los Angeles where he became a Hollywood entertainment correspondent, writing for newspapers and magazines throughout Australia and Britain. 
In 2010, he began working as a host for ESPN SportsCenter.

Swanwick hosts podcast The James Swanwick Show, focused on "health, wealth, love and happiness."

He co-founded international media agency, Crocmedia, which he started with Craig Hutchison in Melbourne, Australia.

In 2015, Swanwick co-founded Swanwick Sleep, with brother Tristan, and founded the Alcohol Freedom Formula, which produces programs including 30 Day No Alcohol Challenge and Project 90 to help people reduce or quit drinking.

Also in 2015, Forbes listed Swanwick as one of 25 Professional Networking Experts to Watch.

Swanwick has been interviewed on podcasts Bulletproof Radio and Ben Greenfield Fitness, been featured in Psychology Today and Yahoo Health. and spoken at health conferences including Paleo f(x).

References

External links 
 

Living people
People from Bacchus Marsh
Australian businesspeople
Australian television presenters
People educated at Anglican Church Grammar School
1975 births